Pawan Kalra is an Indian voice artist that has performed voices for documentaries and has also dubbed many foreign media in Hindi, who currently works for Sugar Mediaz. He is confirmed to be the official Hindi voice-dubbing artist for Arnold Schwarzenegger in India. He has also dubbed Bruce Lee, Eddie Murphy, Will Smith and Owen Wilson's roles in Hindi. He is also the Hindi voice behind Kollywood actor Ajith Kumar. Currently, he voices Geralt of Rivia in the Netflix series, "The Witcher".

He speaks English and Hindi as his mother-tongue languages, but he majorly uses the Hindi language to perform voice dub-over roles in India.

Dubbing career
His elder brother Pankaj Kalra, was already a Hindi voice dubbing artist at the time, before he introduced Pawan into the Voice-dubbing business. He first started performing Hindi dubbing roles with Discovery, Cartoon Network, Pogo, Nickelodeon and Disney Channel programs. Some of the programs that he dubbed in Hindi airs on Pogo.  He is the official Hindi dub-over voice artist for Austro-American actor, Arnold Schwarzenegger.

Dubbing roles

Animated series

Live action television series

Live action films

Hollywood films

Bollywood films

South Indian films
All released without their Hindi dubbed soundtrack albums except I.

Animated films

See also
List of Indian Dubbing Artists
Samay Raj Thakkar - Another Hindi dub-over artist for Arnold Schwarzenegger.

References

1972 births
Living people
Indian male voice actors
Male actors from Mumbai
Male actors in Hindi cinema
Male actors in Hindi television
21st-century Indian male actors